This is a list of the members of the Dewan Negara (Senate) of the Third Parliament of Malaysia. From 1969 to 1971, the National Operations Council governed the country in lieu of the elected government. In 1971, the NOC was dissolved with the restoration of Third Parliament of Malaysia.

Elected by the State Legislative Assembly

Nominated by the Prime Minister and appointed by the Yang di-Pertuan Agong

Death in office
 Oyong Lawai Jau (d. 6 August 1974)

Footnotes

References

Malaysian parliaments
Lists of members of the Dewan Negara